St. Mathias is an unincorporated community in St. Mathias Township, Crow Wing County, Minnesota, United States. It is along Crow Wing County Road 121 near Hay Creek Road and Sleepy Hollow Road. Nearby places include Fort Ripley, Brainerd, and St. Mathias Park. Hay Creek and the Nokasippi River both flow nearby.

References

Unincorporated communities in Crow Wing County, Minnesota
Unincorporated communities in Minnesota